El Enemigo (English The Enemy) is a telenovela made by Mexican TV network Televisa, directed and produced by Ernesto Alonso. It was broadcast in 1979, on weekends only. It was a remake of the 1961 telenovela of the same name.

Cast
Daniela Romo
Jorge Vargas
Lorena Velázquez
Alfonzo Meza
Freddy Fernández
Oscar Servín
José Baviera
Guillermo Zarur
Alicia Montoya

References

External links

1979 telenovelas
Mexican telenovelas
Televisa telenovelas
Spanish-language telenovelas
1979 Mexican television series debuts
1979 Mexican television series endings